CircuitPython is an open-source derivative of the MicroPython programming language targeted toward students and beginners. Development of CircuitPython is supported by Adafruit Industries. It is a software implementation of the  programming language, written in C. It has been ported to run on several modern microcontrollers.

CircuitPython consists of a Python compiler to bytecode and a runtime interpreter of that bytecode that runs on the microcontroller hardware. The user is presented with an interactive prompt (the REPL) to execute supported commands immediately. Included are a selection of core Python libraries. CircuitPython includes modules which give the programmer access to the low-level hardware of supported products as well as higher-level libraries for beginners.

CircuitPython is a fork of MicroPython, originally created by Damien George. The MicroPython community continues to discuss forks of MicroPython into variants such as CircuitPython.

CircuitPython is targeted to be compliant with CPython, the reference implementation of the Python programming language. Programs written for CircuitPython-compatible boards may not run unmodified on other platforms such as the Raspberry Pi.

Usage 
CircuitPython is being used as an emerging alternative solution for microcontroller programming, which is usually done in C, C++, or assembly. The language has also seen uptake in making small, handheld video game devices. Developer Chris Young has ported his infrared transmit-and-receive software to CircuitPython to provide interactivity and to aid those with accessibility issues.

Community 
The user community support includes a Discord chat room and product support forums. A Twitter account dedicated to CircuitPython news was established in 2018. A newsletter, Python on Hardware, is published weekly since 15 November, 2016 by Adafruit to provide news and information on CircuitPython, MicroPython, and Python on single board computers. A Reddit subreddit, r/CircuitPython, provides news on CircuitPython and related news and projects and has about 3,000 members.

Hardware support 
The version 6.2.0 supports Atmel SAMD21 and SAMD51 microcontrollers from Microchip Technology, nRF52833 and nRF52840 from Nordic Semiconductor, CXD5602 (Spresense) from Sony, and STM32 F4-series from STMicroelectronics. Previous versions supported the ESP8266 microcontroller, but its support was dropped in version 4. It also supports single-board computers like Raspberry Pi.

References

External links

 • Tutorials by Tony DiCola / Adafruit

Microcontroller software
Python (programming language)